Viśuddhacāritra (also known as Pure Practice), is one of the four great  primarily or eternally evolved bodhisattvas mentioned in the 15th chapter of the Lotus Sutra. He is considered to represent the "purity" characteristic of buddhahood, "Nirvana's freedom from all that is impure."

See also 
 Supratisthitacaritra
 Visistacaritra

Notes

References 
 
 McCormick, Ryuei M. "The Bodhisattvas of the Earth" Nichirenscoffeehouse.net. Nichiren's Coffeehouse and Gohonzon Gallery, 2002. Web. 15 October 2014.

External links 

 Soka Gakkai Nichiren Buddhism Library - Pure Practices

Bodhisattvas
Nichiren Buddhism
Lotus Sutra